Phormidium allorgei is a species of cyanobacteria in the genus Phormidium.

References 

allorgei